The Ramu languages are a family of some thirty languages of Northern Papua New Guinea. They were identified as a family by John Z'graggen in 1971 and linked with the Sepik languages by Donald Laycock two years later. Malcolm Ross (2005) classifies them as one branch of a Ramu – Lower Sepik language family. Z'graggen had included the Yuat languages, but that now seems doubtful.

With no comprehensive grammar yet available for any of the Ramu languages, the Ramu group remains one of the most poorly documented language groups in the Sepik-Ramu basin.

Classification
The small families listed below in boldface are clearly valid units. The first five, sometimes classified together as Lower Ramu, are relatable through lexical data, so their relationship is widely accepted.

Languages of the Ottilien family share plural morphology with Nor–Pondo.

Late 20th century

Laycock (1973) included the Arafundi family, apparently impressionistically, but Arafundi is poorly known. Ross (2005) retains it in Ramu without comment, but Foley (2005) and Usher reject inclusion. Laycock (1973) also includes the Piawi languages as a branch, but Ross (2005), Foley (2005) and Usher all reject their inclusion.

Usher (2018)
Usher breaks up the Grass/Keram family. His classification of Ramu (with both his own and traditional names) as of 2018 is as follows:

Ramu and Keram Rivers
Keram River
Kambot–Ambakich (East Keram River)
Mongol–Langam (West Keram River)
Ramu River
Banaro (Waran)
Guam and Moam Rivers
Guam River (Tamolan)
Moam River (Ataitan)
Porapora (Grass proper)
Lower Ramu River
Ramu Coast (Ottilien)
Ruboni Range (Misegian)
Middle Ramu River (Annaberg)

Foley (2018)
Foley (2018) provides the following classification, with 5 main branches recognized.

Ramu family
Middle Ramu languages
Tamolan languages
Tangu languages
Lower Ramu languages
Ottilien languages
Ruboni languages
? Grass languages [lexically divergent]
Porapora languages
Koam languages
Banaro
Ap Ma (Kambot / Botin)

Tamolan languages and Tangu languages are sparsely documented, and are mostly attested by short word lists.

Grass languages are lexically divergent, sharing very few cognates with the other Ramu languages, with Banaro and Ap Ma sharing almost none. Foley (2018: 205) leaves open the possibility of Grass being a third branch of the Lower Sepik-Ramu family, with Lower Sepik and Ramu being sister branches.

Pronouns
The pronouns reconstructed by Ross (2005) for Proto-Ramu are:

{| class=wikitable
|-
| I || *aŋko, *ni || we two || *a-ŋk-a || we || *ai, *nai, *a-ni, *na-ni
|-
| thou || *un, *nu || you two || *o-ŋk-oa, *no-ŋk-oa || you || *ne, *u-ni, *nu-ni
|-
| s/he || *man || they two || *mani-ŋk ? || they || *mə, *nda, *manda
|}

However, Grass languages have the innovations *ɲi ‘1sg’ and *re ‘3sg’.

Cognates
Proto-Ramu forms that are widespread across the family (except for the Grass languages) are:

{| 
! gloss !! proto-Ramu
|-
| ‘bird’ || *ŋgwarak
|-
| ‘name’ || *v/ɣi
|-
| ‘ear’ || *kwar
|-
| ‘tooth’ || *nda(r)
|-
| ‘leaf’ || *rapar
|-
| ‘bone’ || *(a)gar
|-
| ‘eat’ || *am(b)
|-
| ‘I’ || *(ŋ)go
|-
| ‘you (sg)’ || *nu
|-
| ‘dative case marker’ || *mV
|}

Foley also reconstructs 7 vowels for proto-Ramu:
{| 
| *i || *ɨ || *u
|-
| *e || *ə || *o
|-
| *a ||  || 
|}

This 7-vowel system is also typical of Ndu languages.

Further reading
Proto-Watam-Awar-Gamay. TransNewGuinea.org. From Foley, W.A. 2005. Linguistic prehistory in the Sepik-Ramu basin. pp. 109–144. Pawley, A., Attenborough, R., Golson, R., & Hide, R. eds. Papuan pasts:cultural, linguistic and biological histories of Papuan-speaking peoples.
Bruce, Leslie P. 2017. Ramu Wordlists, Madang Province. (Part A, Part B, Part C, Part D, Part E, Part F.) Draft. SIL International.

References

External links 
 Timothy Usher, New Guinea World, Proto–East Keram River
(ibid.)  Proto–West Keram River
(ibid.) Proto–Guam and Moam Rivers
Proto–Guam River
Proto–Moam River
Proto–Porapora River
(ibid.) Proto–Lower Ramu River (under construction 2020)
Proto–Ramu Coast
Proto–Ruboni Range
(ibid.) Proto–Middle Ramu River

 
Languages of Papua New Guinea
Papuan languages
Language families